Ciudad Satélite, commonly known as Satélite, is a Greater Mexico City upper class suburban area located in Naucalpan, State of Mexico.  Officially, the name corresponds exclusively to the homonym neighbourhood, Ciudad Satélite, founded circa 1957. But over time, its surrounding area, including upper-class neighbourhoods like Lomas Verdes, Echegaray, Paseos del Bosque or Colonial Satélite, alongside adjacent municipalities Atizapán de Zaragoza and Tlalnepantla de Baz, has also become collectively known as "Satélite", due to its prominence as both an economically and socially dynamic area.

Initially conceived as a "city outside the city", in response to the increasing population of Mexico City's upper classes, it has been one of Mexico's most prominent architectural ventures during the 20th century. Designed and built by Mexican architects Mario Pani and José Luis Cuevas Pietrasanta under the aegis of then president Miguel Alemáns' family ranch, Los Pirules, which was purchased from the Fuentes-Centurion family on the hacienda Los Chabacanos, it quickly became popular among wealthy locals who wanted to acquire property outside the city itself.

Definition 
Satélite was originally conceived as a satellite city, a commuter bedroom community developers hoped to maintain a green belt between it and Mexico City, but its rapid development (and rising property prices) made this untenable. 

However, popular culture, market segmentation, availability of services, and comings and goings of life in this area have helped to define Satélite as a cultural center. Ciudad Satélite became the core of a new suburban phenomenon that eventually included not only single-family dwellings but also apartment buildings, condominiums, and retail spaces. In addition to that, some manufacturing also developed. This was a vast departure from the original concept. Over time, the progress of real estate development has expanded on the original meaning of the Satélite community in the minds of Mexico City residents.

The project was approved by then president Miguel Alemán Valdés in 1948. The city remained uninhabited until 1952, when people started to move in because of the attractive prices. Public services such as the phone lines were not finished yet in all circuits and people initially had to use public phones. By the 1970s, the Ciudad Satélite population vastly increased.

Due to rapid growth, more neighborhoods were developed and are considered as part of the area of Satélite. These neighborhoods are Las Américas neighbourhood, next to Naucalpan City Hall, Vista del Valle (after the famous Norwegian poet), Paseos del Bosque, Pedregal de Echegaray and El Mirador. Some consider the neighbourhoods of San Mateo, La Florida and the Echegaray borough to be part of the south zone of Satélite. The central-western zone consists of Ciudad Satélite, the core neighbourhood, Lomas Verdes, Boulevares, Naucalli Park, and La Concordia. The northern zone consists of Fuentes de Satélite, Santa Cruz del Monte, Bellavista, and Calacoaya neighbourhoods.

History 

The only pre-Hispanic facts known about the area are that once the Tlatilca culture lived in the area formed between Totolinga, Los Cuartos and Hondo rivers. (tucked inside the industrial zone of Naucalpan is a small museum). 
Later, during the colonial period, the Shrine of Our Lady of Los Remedios was built when a Spanish officer found the religious figure under a maguey plant. It is said that the small virgin had been brought by Gonzalo Rodríguez de Villafuerte. The shrine, which divides the Satélite area from the popular zones of Naucalpan municipality, was built in the sixteenth century, and in the architectural compound the well-known caracoles or Los Remedios Aqueduct can be found. 

Ciudad Satélite, the core neighborhood, started as a new urban concept in the mid-fifties, when the rapid growth of Mexico City and the rise of a new, energetic middle class forced the development of entire new neighborhoods. It has been said that the grounds (in the northwestern suburbs of the city, near the old highway to Querétaro) originally belonged to Mexican President Miguel Alemán Valdés, who was in office from 1946 to 1952.  He kept some acres and built a mansion in Doctors Circuit. Architect Mario Pani created most of the urban design.

The great novelty in Ciudad Satélite is the total absence (at least in the core neighborhood) of traffic lights, due to an ingenious street layout with "circuitos" or wide oval circuits where incorporation to other main roads allow drivers to see if cars are coming.  Each of Ciudad Satélite circuits has several streets with names of famous professionals relating to the circuit's name.  The names of the circuits are the following: Centro Comercial (The Mall), Centro Cívico (Civic Center), Sculptors, Painters, Musicians, Mineralogists, Pedagogues, Scientists, Engineers, Teachers, Historians, Surgeons, Doctors, Medics, Geographers, Sailors, Playwrights, Orators, Missionaries, Architects, Poets, Novelists, Economists, Heroes, Jurists, Journalists, Diplomats, and the two external circuits (Circunvalación Oriente y Circunvalación Poniente).

The urban design and the original pricing for the grounds was deliberately intended for segmenting the new city into three areas: middle class, upper middle class and high class.  Novelists and Economists were the circuits with the highest ground prices, so the most spectacular manors were built there.

Many of Ciudad Satélite's houses were built in a functionalist style, absent of any kind of decorative elements in the façade.  This also applies to the so-called Ciudad Satélite's cathedral, San Felipe de Jesús Sanctuary.  This big, spectacular church features many functionalist style elements, as well as paintings.  Other styles present in the neighborhood are colonial, modernist (vintage Mexican architecture), and Spanish or Californian colonial style.

The next neighborhoods were then developed, and the urban extension of Satélite area has been growing ever since. Contemporary issues in Satélite include the big traffic problems (as this is a sleep-over zone, many people drive to Mexico City everyday), the decrepit state of many roads, new concerns of car robberies, violations of environmental regulations, saturation and oversupply of real estate due to new developments, and unauthorised commerce in residential-designed zones.

Sights 
Many of the old history of the area is seen in Our Lady of Los Remedios Shrine and its aqueduct.

The Torres de Satélite (Satellite Towers) landmark stands in the middle of Periferico, Mexico City's main freeway.  Designed by Mathias Goeritz and Luis Barragán and inspired in the painter Jesus Reyes Ferreyra's ideas, it is a significant piece of modern sculpture and architecture.  Due to the fact that nobody really owns the land over which they were built, they were not maintained by any government and had fallen into disrepair. In the latter 1990s they were finally repainted in their original colors, which had been chosen by Barragán.

Naucalli Park is a large extension of eucalyptus forest devoted to the recreation of locals and other inhabitants of nearby areas.  It used to be an ejido (communal agricultural grounds) called Ejido de Oro.  An expropriation decree converted it into a park which has a jogging circuit, many playground spots, monumental fountains, a convention center, an Aaora (forum for art exhibits), a culture house, the branch of a well-known Mexico City restaurant, an archery training ground, a big forum for classical music concerts (the State of Mexico Symphonic Orchestra used to play here on Sundays) and an amusement park with animatronic dinosaurs.

Plaza Satélite, built in the late sixties by the studio of architect Juan Sordo Madaleno, is one of the biggest malls in Mexico City.  It has undergone two full renewals and has all of the big department stores of the country, music stores, restaurants, boutiques, services and a big cinema complex.

Mundo E is a smaller, more middle to lower middle class mall, with libraries, boutiques, cinema complex, fitness center and a couple of nightclubs.

Other smaller malls are Heliplaza, Shopping Plaza and the commerces on Zona Esmeralda.  A new and controversial big mall was built at La Cúspide (The Summit), which is the area's highest ground, offering sweeping views of Mexico City.

The Mall Circuit Zone (Circuito Centro Comercial) is Satélite's central commercial zone. Besides the big mall, it includes several commerces such as restaurants, nightclubs, cafeterias, three bookstores, and banks.

The Blue Zone (La Zona Azul) is a nostalgic pair of commercial blocks that have some of the first businesses that operated in the area. It is such a famous icon of Satélite that it is the local place for joy demonstrations after the Mexico national football team's victories. A well-known ice cream and spicy fruit parlour is the main culinary attraction. There are also other food options, a branch of a world class cafeteria and an old stationery store.

The Ruins of Acropolis was originally built as an outdoor shopping mall. It never obtained popularity and was abandoned.  Nowadays it stands as one of the landmarks of Ciudad Satélite.

Luis Barragán's landscape sculptures can be seen in Arboledas neighbourhood. However, some are in a decrepit state.

Parque de los Ciervos (Wild Deer Park) in Zona Esmeralda is a forest park where wild deer are raised. It has picnic and playground facilities.

Education, culture and sports 
Satélite has some private schools as well as a couple of public junior high schools. School competition is officially low but is a big issue of pride for many "satelucos". The area houses the UNAM Faculty of Superior Studies at Acatlán and a Universidad del Valle de Mexico (UVM) university campus.

Some of Mexico's Olympic medallists have lived or currently live here, including Carlos Mercenario, Soraya Jiménez, Dolores Knoll, and Fernando Platas. In the lower zone of Boulevares, almost next to Acatlán Town, are the fields of the zone representative teams, such as the Buccaneers (Bucaneros), the Cowboys (Vaqueros), the Black Dogs (Perros Negros), and the Redskins (Pieles Rojas). There is also a local soccer football league, Liga de Fútbol Satélite.

Cultural exports from Satélite include classical tenor Rolando Villazón, the members of the band Café Tacvba, troubadour Fernando Delgadillo, and rock band Dildo.

In the 60s, Monseñor Jose de Jesus Lopez created ARDECUSA (Arte Deporte y Cultura de Satélite, in Spanish), a group of young people that enhanced the Cultural and sports life in Satelite through Theatre, Choirs, groups, sports teams, newspapers, and others. The most famous were Coro Genesis (founded by Gerardo Bru and Hilda and Gustavo Anaya) that was the only choir in the area that won 3 times the GYCAS (Grupos y Coros del Area Satélite). Also, Gerardo Bru was the President of ARDECUSA for many years and the group presented most of the very memorable Musicals like Seven Brides for Seven Brothers, The King and I, Something´s Afoot, Godspell, Grease, and Anything Goes.

References

External links
 Ciudad Satellite TV Television y guia por internet de los Satelucos
 History of Naucalpan Municipality
 Plaza Satélite – History of Plaza Satélite shopping mall
 Satelín-Torres, activist group focused on creating conscience around the identity of Ciudad Satélite and being a "Sateluco".

Mexico City metropolitan area
Naucalpan de Juárez
Populated places established in 1948
1948 establishments in Mexico
Neighborhoods in the State of Mexico
Edge cities in Mexico
Mario Pani buildings